The 1894–95 season was the second season in which Dundee competed at a Scottish national level, playing in Division One, finishing 8th place for the 2nd consecutive season. Dundee would also compete in the Scottish Cup for the first time in their history, making it to the semi-finals of the competition.

Scottish Division One 

Statistics provided by Dee Archive

League table

Scottish Cup 

Statistics provided by Dee Archive

Player Statistics 

|}

See also 

 List of Dundee F.C. seasons

References 

 

Dundee F.C. seasons
Dundee